Berghem (older spelling: Berchem) is a town in the Dutch municipality of Oss. It is located about 4 km northeast of Oss itself.

History 
The village was first mentioned in 1286 as Berchem, and means "settlement on a hill".

The Catholic St Willibrordus Church has been built between 1900 and 1903 adjacent to a 15th century tower. The medieval was replaced in 1858, but burnt down in 1895.

Berghem was home to 1,906 people in 1804.
Until 1994, Berghem was a separate municipality, when it was merged into Oss.

Gallery

References

Municipalities of the Netherlands disestablished in 1994
Former municipalities of North Brabant
Populated places in North Brabant
Oss